Prairie House, California may refer to:
 Prairie House (Browns Valley), California, former settlement near Browns Valley
 Prairie House (Marysville), California, former settlement near Marysville